Cárcel Modelo, also known as Cárcel Celular, was the main prison for men in Madrid at the turn of the 20th century. Located in the Moncloa-Aravaca district, it was inaugurated in 1884 after seven years of construction and replaced the 18th century Cárcel del Saladero. The name "Modelo" derived from its standing as a model for other Spanish prisons. The prison operated through 1939, when it was shuttered and demolished after being damaged during the Spanish Civil War.

See also 

 Cárcel Modelo massacre

References 

Defunct prisons in Spain
1884 establishments in Spain
Buildings and structures completed in 1884
1939 disestablishments in Spain
Buildings and structures in Argüelles neighborhood, Madrid
Demolished buildings and structures in Madrid
Men's prisons